Elisha Williams McKinstry (April 10, 1824 – November 1, 1901) was a California jurist of the nineteenth century. He served as a justice of the California Supreme Court from 1874 to 1888.

Biography
McKinstry was born April 10, 1824, in Detroit, Michigan. He moved to Kinderhook, New York, read law and in 1847 was admitted to the New York bar.

In 1849, McKinstry came to California on the steamship Panama. and was a member of the first California State Assembly representing Sacramento.  In 1851, he opened a law practice in Napa, and was elected in 1852 as judge of the Seventh Judicial District Court for a term of six years, and in 1858 was re-elected. In August 1860, he visited Paris, France, returning to California the following month. On November 13, 1862, he resigned from the district court. In January 1863, he moved to Mono County, California, and practiced law. In August 1863, during the American Civil War, he was nominated for Lieutenant Governor by the Copperhead Democratic Party, but lost the election. Afterwards, he moved Nevada, where he practiced law and ran unsuccessfully for a seat on the Nevada Supreme Court. In October 1864, he attended the Copperhead Democratic convention held in Carson, Nevada.

In October 1867, having returned to California, he was elected San Francisco county judge for a term of four years, but before his term expired he was elected as an independent candidate as a judge of the 12th District Court. In October 1867, during the election, a Catholic priest accused McKinstry of leading the Aurora Vigilance Committee, a quasi-lynch mob, in 1863 in Esmeralda County, Nevada, and refusing to accommodate the request for last rites by four men who were condemned to hang.

In September 1873, he was nominated by the People's Independent Party and elected on October 15, 1873, to the California Supreme Court, where he served from January 1874 to October 1, 1888. McKinstry filled the seat of former Chief Justice Royal Sprague, who died in office, and whose appointed successor, Isaac S. Belcher, did not run for election. In 1879, when adoption of a new constitution required elections for all seats on the Supreme Court, McKinstry was nominated by both the Democratic Party and Workingman's Party and was re-elected. The newly elected judges drew lots to determine the length of term, and McKinstry drew an 11-year term. His notable cases include Lux v. Haggin, holding riparian rights prevailed in California. He resigned from the court on October 1, 1888.

After stepping down from the bench, from 1888 to 1895 he was a professor of law at the University of California's Hastings College of the Law in San Francisco. He also engaged in private practice with his son, James C. McKinstry, and later with John A. Stanly and H. W. Bradley in the firm of Stanly, McKinstry, Bradley & McKinstry.

McKinstry died on November 1, 1901, in San Jose, California.

Honors and awards
On December 20, 1899, McKinstry delivered the oration to the Jubilee Celebration at San Jose, California commemorating 50 years of statehood.

McKinstry was awarded an honorary LL.D. from the University of Michigan.

Clubs
McKinstry was president of the Society of California Pioneers.

Personal life
On July 27, 1863, McKinstry was married to Annie L. Hedges at Marysville, California, and they had two sons and two daughters: Capt. Charles H. McKinstry, Laura L. McKinstry, James C. McKinstry, and Frances McKinstry.

See also
 List of justices of the Supreme Court of California

References

Sources
 Jones, William Carey (1901). Illustrated History of the University of California, p. 321

External links
 Elisha W. McKinstry. California Supreme Court Historical Society. Retrieved July 24, 2017
 Past & Present Justices. California State Courts. Retrieved July 19, 2017.

1824 births
1901 deaths
Kenyon College alumni
University of California, Hastings faculty
Justices of the Supreme Court of California
U.S. state supreme court judges admitted to the practice of law by reading law
Democratic Party members of the California State Assembly
19th-century American judges
19th-century American lawyers
Lawyers from Detroit
Lawyers from San Francisco
California pioneers
Copperheads (politics)
19th-century American politicians